PP-190 Okara-VIII is a Constituency of Provincial Assembly of Punjab.It was previously known as PP-193 (Okara IX).

General elections 2013

General elections 2008

See also
 PP-189 Okara-VII
 PP-191 Pakpattan-I

References

External links
 Election commission Pakistan's official website
 Awazoday.com check result
 Official Website of Government of Punjab

Constituencies of Punjab, Pakistan